Myrtle McAteer won the singles tennis title of the 1900 U.S. Women's National Singles Championship by defeating Edith Parker 6–2, 6–2, 6–0 in the final of the All Comers' competition. The reigning champion Marion Jones did not defend her title and therefore no challenge round was held. The event was played on outdoor grass courts and held at the Philadelphia Cricket Club in Wissahickon Heights, Chestnut Hill, Philadelphia from June 19 through June 23, 1900.

Draw

All Comers' finals

References

1900
1900 in American women's sports
June 1900 sports events
Women's Singles
1900 in women's tennis
Women's sports in Pennsylvania
Chestnut Hill, Philadelphia
1900 in sports in Pennsylvania